Myles Nazem Amine (born December 14, 1996) is a Sammarinese-American freestyle and folkstyle wrestler who competes at 86 kilograms. He represents San Marino due to his maternal great-grandfather being a citizen. In freestyle, Amine won bronze for San Marino at the 2020 Summer Olympics and claimed medals at the European Games and the European Championships.

In folkstyle, Amine is a five-time  NCAA Division I All-American and two-time Big Ten Conference Champion (four-time finalist) for the Michigan Wolverines. Amine was the top-seeded 197-pound NCAA wrestler heading into the 2021 national championships, but finished third. His paternal grandfather Nazem Amine was also a freestyle wrestler who competed for Lebanon at the 1960 Summer Olympics.

He won the gold medal in the 86 kg event at the 2022 Mediterranean Games held in Oran, Algeria. He competed in the 86kg event at the 2022 World Wrestling Championships held in Belgrade, Serbia.

References

External links 
 
 
 

Living people
1996 births
Wrestlers at the 2019 European Games
European Games medalists in wrestling
European Games bronze medalists for San Marino
European Wrestling Championships medalists
Wrestlers at the 2020 Summer Olympics
American people of Sammarinese descent
American people of Lebanese descent
Sammarinese people of Lebanese descent
Sportspeople of Lebanese descent
Olympic wrestlers of San Marino
Olympic bronze medalists for San Marino
Olympic medalists in wrestling
Medalists at the 2020 Summer Olympics
Michigan Wolverines wrestlers
European Wrestling Champions
Mediterranean Games gold medalists for San Marino
Mediterranean Games medalists in wrestling
Competitors at the 2022 Mediterranean Games